BHJ may refer to:

In optoelectronics:
 Bulk Heterojunctions, a type of junction in organic solar cell

Facilities that share a runway and IATA code:
Bhuj Airport, domestic airport
Bhuj Rudra Mata Air Force Base, Indian Air Force base